Anton Šoltís (born 5 February 1976) is a retired Slovak football midfielder who is the current manager of FC Košice.

External links
MFK Košice profile

References

1976 births
Living people
Slovak footballers
Slovak football managers
Slovakia international footballers
Association football midfielders
FC Lokomotíva Košice players
AS Trenčín players
Partizán Bardejov players
FC VSS Košice players
1. FC Tatran Prešov players
SK Slavia Prague players
FC Petržalka players
ŠK Futura Humenné players
Slovak Super Liga players
Czech First League players
Expatriate footballers in the Czech Republic
Slovak expatriate sportspeople in the Czech Republic
Expatriate footballers in Austria
Slovak expatriate sportspeople in Austria
MFK Zemplín Michalovce managers
MFK Tatran Liptovský Mikuláš managers
FK Senica managers
Sportspeople from Košice